Coal Run is a stream in the U.S. state of Ohio. It is a tributary to Archers Fork.

Coal Run is noted for deposits of coal near its course.

References

Rivers of Ohio
Rivers of Washington County, Ohio